Salvia africana-lutea (beach salvia, dune salvia, golden salvia, bruin- of sandsalie, geelblomsalie) is a shrubby evergreen perennial native to coastal sand dunes and hills on the coast of the Western Cape, Eastern Cape and Northern Cape in South Africa. It has numerous woody stems growing to more than 1 m in height and width, with sparse grey-green leaves. The flowers start out as a bright yellow, turning into a rusty color, with the dark rusty-colored calyx persisting long after fruiting begins.

Traditional use
S. africana-lutea was used by early European settlers to treat colds, tuberculosis, and chronic bronchitis. Traditional indigenous healers use it for respiratory ailments, influenza, gynaecological complaints, fever, headaches and digestive disorders.

Notes

External links
 "Salvia aurea" at South African National Biodiversity Institute

africana-lutea
Endemic flora of South Africa
~
Plants used in traditional African medicine
Plants described in 1753
Taxa named by Carl Linnaeus
Garden plants of Southern Africa